The Indianapolis Athletics were a Negro league baseball team in the Negro American League, based in Indianapolis, Indiana, in 1937. Ted Strong was their player-manager. After their only season in 1937, they were replaced by the Indianapolis ABCs.

References

Negro league baseball teams
Athletics
African-American history of Indianapolis
Defunct baseball teams in Indiana
Baseball teams disestablished in 1937
Baseball teams established in 1937
1937 establishments in Indiana
1937 disestablishments in Indiana